Evaza is a genus of flies in the family Stratiomyidae.

Species
Evaza argyroceps Bigot, 1879
Evaza aterrima James, 1969
Evaza atripluma James, 1969
Evaza aurivestis James, 1969
Evaza batchianensis Woodley, 1989
Evaza bicolor Chen, Zhang & Yang, 2010
Evaza bipars Walker, 1856
Evaza brandti James, 1969
Evaza cordata James, 1969
Evaza dimidiata James, 1969
Evaza discalis James, 1962
Evaza discolor Meijere, 1916
Evaza fenestrata James, 1969
Evaza flava James, 1969
Evaza flavimarginata Zhang & Yang, 2010
Evaza flavipalpis James, 1969
Evaza flavipes Bigot, 1879
Evaza flaviscutellata Enderlein, 1914
Evaza flaviscutellum Chen, Zhang & Yang, 2010
Evaza floresina Lindner, 1937
Evaza formosana Kertész, 1914
Evaza fortis (Walker, 1865)
Evaza fulviventris Bigot, 1879
Evaza funerea James, 1969
Evaza gracilis James, 1969
Evaza gressitti James, 1969
Evaza hainanensis Zhang & Yang, 2010
Evaza hardyi James, 1969
Evaza hyliapennis Yang, Zhang & Li, 2014
Evaza impendens (Walker, 1859)
Evaza incidens Curran, 1936
Evaza indica Kertész, 1906
Evaza inflata James, 1969
Evaza interrupta James, 1969
Evaza japonica Lindner, 1938
Evaza javanensis Meijere, 1911
Evaza kerteszi Meijere, 1914
Evaza lanata James, 1969
Evaza lutea James, 1969
Evaza maculifera Meijere, 1914
Evaza mollis (Osten Sacken, 1881)
Evaza nigripennis Kertész, 1909
Evaza nigrispinis Meijere, 1924
Evaza nigritibia Chen, Zhang & Yang, 2010
Evaza nubifera James, 1969
Evaza pallipes Bigot, 1879
Evaza philippinensis James, 1969
Evaza picticornis James, 1969
Evaza quatei James, 1969
Evaza ravitibia Chen, Zhang & Yang, 2010
Evaza rossi James, 1969
Evaza scenopinoides (Walker, 1858)
Evaza scutellaris James, 1969
Evaza similis James, 1969
Evaza solomensis Curran, 1936
Evaza testacea (Hollis, 1963)
Evaza tibialis (Walker, 1861)
Evaza varia James, 1969
Evaza varipes James, 1969
Evaza ventralis James, 1969
Evaza whitneyi Curran, 1936
Evaza yoshimotoi James, 1969
Evaza zhangae Zhang & Yang, 2010

References

Stratiomyidae
Brachycera genera
Taxa named by Francis Walker (entomologist)
Diptera of Asia
Diptera of Australasia